Abu Nasr (also Romanized as Abū Naşr) is a village in Sarchehan Rural District, Sarchehan District, Bavanat County, Fars Province, Iran. At the 2006 census, its population was 155, in 36 families.

See also

References 

Populated places in Sarchehan County